The 12307 / 12308 Howrah–Jodhpur Express is a Superfast Express train belonging to Indian Railways that runs between  and Jodhpur in India. It operates as train number 12307 from Howrah Junction to Jodhpur and as train number 12308 in the reverse direction.

Service

The 12307 Howrah–Jodhpur Express covers the distance of 1810 kilometres in 30 hours 20 mins (59.79 km/hr) & in 29 hours 45 mins as 12308 Jodhpur–Howrah Express (60.00 km/hr).

As the average speed of the train is more than 59 km/hr, its fare includes a Superfast surcharge.

Route and halts

Traction

A WAP-7 locomotive from the Howrah shed hauls the train from Howrah to Jaipur Junction after which a Bhagat Ki Kothi-based WDP-4 / WDP-4B / WDP-4D locomotive hauls the train for the remainder of the journey until  and vice versa.

External links
 www.indianrail.gov.in

References

Transport in Jodhpur
Rail transport in Howrah
Express trains in India
Rail transport in West Bengal
Rail transport in Jharkhand
Rail transport in Uttar Pradesh
Rail transport in Rajasthan
Rail transport in Bihar